In mathematics, a Lie bialgebra is the Lie-theoretic case of a bialgebra: it is a set with a Lie algebra and a Lie coalgebra structure which are compatible.

It is a bialgebra where the multiplication  is skew-symmetric and satisfies a dual Jacobi identity, so that the dual vector space is a Lie algebra, whereas the comultiplication is a 1-cocycle, so that the multiplication and comultiplication are compatible.  The cocycle condition implies that, in practice, one studies only classes of bialgebras that are cohomologous to a Lie bialgebra on a coboundary.

They are also called Poisson-Hopf algebras, and are the Lie algebra of a Poisson–Lie group.

Lie bialgebras occur naturally in the study of the Yang–Baxter equations.

Definition
A vector space  is a Lie bialgebra if it is a Lie algebra,
and there is the structure of Lie algebra also on the dual vector space  which is compatible.
by a Lie bracket  
bracket .

and the compatibility condition is the following cocycle relation:

where  is the adjoint.

Example
Let  be any semisimple Lie algebra. 
To specify a Lie bialgebra structure we thus need to specify a compatible Lie algebra structure on the dual vector space. 
Choose a Cartan subalgebra  and a choice of positive roots. 
Let  be the corresponding opposite Borel subalgebras, so that  and there is a natural projection .
Then define a Lie algebra 

Now identify  with  dual of  via the pairing

Note that  is solvable, whereas  is semisimple.

Relation to Poisson-Lie groups
The Lie algebra  of a Poisson-Lie group G has a natural structure of Lie bialgebra.
gives the  Lie bracket on 
 (recalling that a linear Poisson structure on a vector space is the same thing as a Lie bracket on the dual vector space). 
In more detail, let G be a Poisson-Lie group, with  being two smooth functions on the group manifold. Let  be the differential at the identity element. Clearly, .

where  is the Poisson bracket. Given  be the Poisson bivector on the manifold, define  to be the right-translate of the bivector to the identity element in G.  Then one has that

The cocommutator is then the tangent map:

so that

is the dual of the cocommutator.

See also

Lie coalgebra
Manin triple

References
 H.-D. Doebner, J.-D. Hennig, eds, Quantum groups, Proceedings of the 8th International Workshop on Mathematical Physics, Arnold Sommerfeld Institute, Claausthal, FRG, 1989, Springer-Verlag Berlin, .
 Vyjayanthi Chari and Andrew Pressley, A Guide to Quantum Groups, (1994), Cambridge University Press, Cambridge .
 

Lie algebras
Coalgebras
Symplectic geometry